Anthe Ioanna Philippides was appointed as a judge on 14 December 2000 to the Supreme Court of Queensland, which is the highest ranking court in the Australian State of Queensland.

Philippides has also served on the Mental Health Court and the Southern District of the Land Appeal Court.

She was educated at Somerville House, the University of Queensland, and Gonville and Caius College, Cambridge .

See also
 Judiciary of Australia
 List of Judges of the Supreme Court of Queensland

References

External links
Qld Judiciary Profile

Judges of the Supreme Court of Queensland
Australian women judges
Year of birth missing (living people)
Living people
University of Queensland alumni
Alumni of Gonville and Caius College, Cambridge